Proline-serine-threonine phosphatase-interacting protein 2 is an enzyme that in humans is encoded by the PSTPIP2 gene. This protein, also known as macrophage F-actin-associated and tyrosine phosphorylated protein (MAYP) is a member of the Pombe Cdc15 homology (PCH) family of proteins has been shown to coordinate membrane and cytoskeletal dynamics

Function 
Pstpip2 is selectively expressed in macrophages and macrophage precursors, and it is an actin bundling protein which regulates filopodia formation and macrophage motility

Cytokine expression profile 
PSTPIP2 deficiency leads to elevated levels of circulating inflammatory mediators in vivo. In asymptomatic mice, only MIP-1α and IL-6 are elevated, however symptomatic PSTPIP2-deficient mice have elevated levels of circulating IL-6, MIP-1α, TNF-α, CSF-1 and IP-10 and decreased levels of IL-13

Disease linkage 
The missense mutation I282N leads to a macrophage-mediated autoinflammatory disease called Lupo Pstpip2 (Pstpip2Lupo/Lupo ). It is characterized by skin necrosis, inflammation of paws, ears and inflammatory bone resorption. Another mutation in Pstpip2, L98P, was described in chronic multifocal osteomyelitis (cmo) mice. This disease is also autoinflammatory, and causes inflammatory infiltrate of polymorphonuclear leukocytes, macrophages, lymphocytes, plasma cells and osteoclasts. Later the infiltrate is replaced with new bone tissue which lead to tail kinks and hind-foot deformities. The cmo mice also develop ear inflammation in the epidermis, dermis and cartilage.

Interactions 
PSTPIP2 interacts with protein tyrosine phosphatases from the proline-, glutamic acid-, serine- and threonine-rich (PEST) family, SHIP1 and Csk

References

Further reading